Aethosia is a monotypic moth genus in the subfamily Arctiinae. Its only species, Aethosia ectrocta, is found in Haiti. Both the genus and species were first described by George Hampson in 1900.

References

Lithosiini
Monotypic moth genera
Moths of the Caribbean